The Copa do Brasil 2000 was the 12th staging of the Copa do Brasil. 

The competition started on March 9, 2000, and concluded on July 9, 2000, with the second leg of the final, held at the Mineirão stadium in Belo Horizonte, in which Cruzeiro lifted the trophy for the third time with a 2-1 victory over São Paulo.

Oséas, of Cruzeiro, with 10 goals, was the competition's top scorer.

Format
69 clubs disputed the competition in a knock-out format where all rounds were played over two legs, and the away goals rule was used, but in the first two rounds if the away team won the first leg with an advantage of at least two goals, the second leg was not played. The club automatically qualified to the next round.

Participating teams

Competition stages

First round

|}

Second round

|}

Third round

|}

Round of Sixteen

|}

Quarterfinals

|}

Semifinals

|}

Final

|}

References
 Copa do Brasil 2000 at RSSSF

2000 domestic association football cups
2000
2000 in Brazilian football